The Statue of Iddi-Ilum is a 21st-century BCE statue of the praying figure of Iddi-ilum (i-ti-ilum), the military governor, or Shakkanakku, of the ancient city-state of Mari in eastern Syria. The headless statue was discovered at the Royal Palace of Mari during excavations directed by French archaeologist André Parrot. The statue was made of soapstone and bears an inscription identifying the figure and dedicating it to the goddess Ishtar or Inanna. The statue is now displayed at the Musée du Louvre in Paris. He was contemporary of the Third Dynasty of Ur, and probably their vassal.

Overview

The soapstone statue depicts the standing figure in a traditional prayer posture with the hands clasped against the chest. The figure's head is lost, but his beard is still visible. The beard is sculpted in eight symmetrical braids that are curled at the end. The statue's right arm and elbow are also lost. The figure is dressed in a long robe made of a single piece of fine-weave cloth that is draped around the body. The robe's borders are richly decorated with fringes and tassels. In a departure from Mesopotamian tradition regarding these garments, the robe covers both shoulders and is bound at the waist with a belt.

Inscription
The bottom of the robe bears a cuneiform inscription in Akkadian stating the name and position of the figure, and the deity the statue was dedicated to. The goddess has been interpreted as either Ishtar, or a Sumerian equivalent, Inanna. The inscription, engraved in ten columns, reads: "Iddi-Ilum, shakkanakku of Mari, has dedicated his statue to Inanna. Whosoever erases this inscription will have his line wiped out by Inanna."

Significance
The statue is one of three known statues of the shakkanakku of Mari, the others being that of Ishtup-Ilum and the horned statue of Puzur-Ishtar. During the reign of Mari's last king, Zimrilim, these ancestral rulers were actively promoted through honorific rituals known as "kispum." The statues were also prominently displayed in the throne room of the Royal Palace of Mari. The horns in the similar statue of Puzur-Ishtar suggest that he was deified, but the same can not be verified in the case of Iddi-Ilum and Ishtup-Ilum.

Excavation
The statue was found during the fourth excavation season at Mari (Winter 1936–1937) by the French excavation team under André Parrot. The two pieces of the statue were found in courtyard 148 of the royal palace.

Gallery

See also

Art of Mesopotamia
Investiture of Zimrilim
Statue of Ebih-Il

References

Citations

Bibliography

21st-century BC works
3rd-millennium BC sculptures
1930s archaeological discoveries
Sculpture of the Ancient Near East
Syrian art
Archaeological discoveries in Mari, Syria
Near East and Middle East antiquities of the Louvre
Stone sculptures
Sumerian art and architecture
Inanna